Ratchawong Pier (sometimes spelled: Rachawongse; designated pier code N5) is a pier on Chao Phraya River in Bangkok.

Description
Ratchawong Pier located at the end of Ratchawong Road in the area of Chinatown close to historic and shopping districts, Sampheng  and Song Wat Road. The pier was the port where goods were embarking to the cargo ships anchored middle the Chao Phraya River. These ships were the main means of transport, both passengers and cargoes, links Bangkok to Chonburi, Chanthaburi, Prachuap Khiri Khan, Chumphon, and Ban Don (Surat Thani). 

At its heyday there was direct tram route to the pier, and around 11.00 p.m. or midnight during the Chinese New Year, it was also a pier that supports many passengers to take ferry to pay homage Sampokong, a large Buddha of Wat Kanlayanamit in Thonburi side. 

Presently, the pier is one of the main ports for passenger ferries crossing Chao Phraya River to Tha Din Daeng, the another Bangkok's Chinatown. The ferry or passenger ship business is owned by the private company.
  Based on 2002 data, about 25,000 people use this pier per day.

In addition, in the post-World War II, this pier was considered a venue for young people similar to Siam Square at present. It was a centre of many famous and tasty restaurants.

Transportation
Chao Phraya Express Boat: all boat routes
BMTA bus: route 1, 4, 7, 21, 25, 40, 53, 73, 73ก, 204 (terminal), 508 
ICONSIAM: free shuttle boat

References

External links
Chao Phraya Express Boat
Samphanthawong district
Chao Phraya Express Boat piers